Thomas Schmidheiny (born 17 December 1945) is a Swiss billionaire businessman, and the former chairman of cement manufacturer Holcim.

Early life
Thomas Schmidheiny was born in 1945, the son of Max Schmidheiny (1908-1991). The family's construction materials empire (bricks, cement, etc.) was divided in 1984, with Thomas inheriting Holcim, the concrete and cement company, and his brother Stephan, also a billionaire, was given the construction company Eternit.

Career
Until 2003, Schmidheiny was the chairman of Holcim, one of the world's leading cement manufacturers, founded by his grand-uncle in 1912. Schmidheiny resigned his chairmanship as part of a deal to settle an investigation of insider trading in Spain. He has remained on the Board since that time. Since the merger between Holcim and Lafarge Thomas Schmidheiny retains 11.4% of the company Lafarge-Holcim and is the biggest shareholder of the firm.

Education
Schmidheiny holds a doctorate from Tufts University and a bachelor's degree from Zurich Polytechnic, and an MBA from IMD Business School, Switzerland.

Honors
The Indian School of Business has a Thomas Schmidheiny chair of family business. As of 2012, the post was held by Kavil Ramachandran.

Personal life
Schmidheiny is married with four children; he owns vineyards and wineries in Argentina, Switzerland and the US, including his residence in Klosters.

References

Swiss businesspeople
Swiss billionaires
Living people
Tufts University alumni
1945 births
Thomas